Malcolm Braly (July 25, 1925April 7, 1980) was an American author born in Portland, Oregon. He spent much of his life in and out of various prisons, including Folsom Prison and San Quentin, before earning recognition as an author after his final release from prison in 1965.

His most acclaimed novel, On the Yard, was first published in 1967, and adapted to film in 1979.  His other books include Felony Tank (1961); Shake Him Till He Rattles (1963); It's Cold Out There (1966); his memoir, False Starts: A Memoir of San Quentin and Other Prisons (1976); and his final novel, The Protector (1979).

Braly died of injuries sustained from a traffic accident in Baltimore, Maryland, at 54.

References

External links

Malcolm Braly at Starkhousepress.com

Prison writings
1925 births
1980 deaths
20th-century American novelists
20th-century American male writers
Writers from Portland, Oregon
American male novelists
Prisoners and detainees of California
San Quentin State Prison inmates
Novelists from Oregon